Halophila johnsonii, or Johnson's seagrass, is a small, asexual seagrass in the family Hydrocharitaceae (the "tape-grasses").  It occurs only on the southeastern coast of Florida, and was the first marine plant listed on the United States endangered species list, where it is listed as a threatened species.  Female flowers have been observed, but even with decade long observational studies, neither male flowers nor seed have ever been observed.

It may have the most limited distribution of all seagrasses.  It occurs only in lagoons along roughly 200 km of the Florida coastline between Sebastian Inlet and the northern part of Biscayne Bay, where it grows in small patches of a few centimeters to a few meters in diameter at depths ranging from the intertidal zone down to 3 meters.

Prior to 1980, the species designation was uncertain.  It was sometimes referred to as either Halophila decipiens or H. baillonis Ascherson, despite most closely resembling H. ovalis.

Morphologically, Johnson's seagrass is recognized by the presence of pairs of linearly shaped foliage leaves, each with a petiole formed on the node of a horizontally creeping rhizome.  The rhizome is located at or just below the sediment surface and is anchored to unconsolidated substrate by unbranched roots.  The leaves are generally 2-5 cm long (including the petioles), and the rhizome internodes rarely exceed 3-5 cm in length, making this species appear diminutive relative to the larger seagrasses.

Both the Green sea turtle and the West Indian manatee are known to feed upon the plant, as well as some herbivorous fish.  However, the main threat to species survival is probably human activity. Processes that threaten the plant include eutrophication, dredging, turbidity, and thermal pollution.

References

External links
 Johnson's Seagrass page hosted by NOAA Fisheries Office of Protected Resources

johnsonii
Endemic flora of Florida